Tylecodon wallichii is a species of succulent plant in the genus Tylecodon belonging to the family Crassulaceae. The species is named in honour of Nathaniel Wallich, early 19th century Danish plant hunter, botanist and physician.

Description

Tylecodon wallichii is a low sparsely branched shrublets reaching a height of about 50 cm (up to 1 m) with a single thick succulent stem up to 6 cm in diameter. Greyish branches are densely covered with residual leaf bases (phyllopodia) up to 1.5 cm long and crowded leaves on their tips. Leaves are yellowish to ash-green, hairless, ascending, slightly curved inward, tapering towards the apex, with a shallow groove along upper side, 6.5 — 9.5 cm (up to 15 cm) long. Plants blossom during summer, producing spreading to pendent clusters of dangling yellowish-green, urn-shaped flowers of 7-12 mm long with spreading to recurved lobes.

Hybridises with Tylecodon paniculatus.

Distribution
Gravelly or sandy slopes of South Namibia and RCA from Namaqualand into the Great and Little Karoo.

Toxicity
The plant contains bufadienolide-type cardiac glycoside cotyledoside which causes nenta poisoning ("krimpsiekte") in livestock.

Subspecies
 Tylecodon wallichii subsp. wallichii — South Namibia, RCA (Northern Cape)
 Tylecodon wallichii subsp. ecklonianus (Harv.) Toelken — South Namibia, RCA (Northern and Western Cape)

References

External links

 World of Succulents
 Bihrmann

Plants described in 1978
Flora of South Africa
Flora of Namibia
wallichii